The 3rd Daytime Emmy Awards were held Tuesday, May 11, 1976 to commemorate excellence in daytime programming from the previous year (1975). The third awards only had three categories, and thus three awards were given. Hosted by Bob Barker, the telecast aired from 3-4:30 p.m. EST on CBS and preempted reruns of All in the Family, plus Match Game and Tattletales.

Winners in each category are in bold.

Outstanding Daytime Drama Series

All My Children
Another World
Days of Our Lives
The Young and the Restless

Outstanding Actor in a Daytime Drama Series

Macdonald Carey (Dr. Tom Horton, Days of our Lives)
Bill Hayes (Doug Williams, Days of our Lives)
John Beradino (Dr. Steve Hardy, General Hospital)
Shepperd Strudwick (Victor Lord, One Life to Live)
Larry Haines (Stu Bergman, Search for Tomorrow)
Michael Nouri (Steve Kaslo, Search for Tomorrow)

Outstanding Actress in a Daytime Drama Series

Frances Heflin (Mona Kane, All My Children)
Susan Seaforth Hayes (Julie Olson, Days of Our Lives)
Denise Alexander (Dr. Lesley Williams Faulkner, General Hospital)
Helen Gallagher (Maeve Ryan, Ryan's Hope)
Mary Stuart (Joanne Vincente, Search for Tomorrow)

Outstanding Daytime Drama Series Writing
 All My Children
 The Edge of Night
 Guiding Light
 The Young and the Restless
 Days of our Lives

Outstanding Daytime Drama Series Directing
 The Doctors
 One Life to Live
 The Young and the Restless

Outstanding Game Show
The $20,000 Pyramid - A Bob Stewart Production for ABC (Syn. by Viacom)
The Price Is Right - A Mark Goodson-Bill Todman Production for CBS (Syn. by Viacom)
Match Game - A Mark Goodson-Bill Todman Production for CBS  (Syn. by Jim Victory)
Hollywood Squares - A Heatter-Quigley Production for NBC (Syn. by Filmways)
Let's Make a Deal - A Stefan Hatos-Monty Hall Production for ABC (Syn. by WorldVision)

Outstanding Game Show Host
Allen Ludden (Password)
Peter Marshall (The Hollywood Squares)
Geoff Edwards (Jackpot)

References

003
D